A Gold Medal Winning Tramp Dog is a 2014 Chinese comedy-drama film directed by Mario and produced by Zhibao He. The story of the film narrates relationship between a young boy and a street dog. The movie was released on 21 January 2014. The film directed by Mario Lo has a run time of 1 hour 21 minutes.

Plot 
Lu Fei, a teenage boy found the dog, Dong Dong, wandering on the streets in an almost dying condition. He felt sympathetic towards it and decided to adopt it. Lu Fei soon found out the talent of Dong Dong, and despite the disagreement from his father and the school manager, he kept it to train it for the Gold Medal Winning Tramp Dog championship.

Cast 
 Mao Yi
 Lv Hongxu
 Cui Bing
 Wang Lei
 Sun Taojie

Reception 
The film received positive to mixed reviews from film critics. In Sohu review, it was written that the film had a "fresh, smooth style and care of stray animals theme".

References 

2014 films
2010s Mandarin-language films
Chinese comedy-drama films
2014 comedy-drama films